Gislaved is a locality and the seat of Gislaved Municipality, Jönköping County, Sweden with 10,231 inhabitants in 2017, out of a municipal total of nearly 30,000.

Sports
The following sports clubs are located in Gislaved:

 Gislaveds IS
 Gislaveds VBK

References 

Populated places in Jönköping County
Municipal seats of Jönköping County
Populated places in Gislaved Municipality
Swedish municipal seats
Finnveden